Umm Tina, also called Biʾir al-ʿUmrānī, was among the most crucial and ancient wells in the former Migrin neighborhood of present-day Riyadh, Saudi Arabia. It was called Umm Tina because a huge fig-tree standing next to it. It was frequently mentioned in several poems and historical documents from 18th and 19th centuries.

References 

Water wells